Yimnashana hamulata is a species of beetle in the family Cerambycidae. It was described by Gressitt in 1937. It is known from China.

Subspecies
 Yimnashana hamulata hamulata (Gressitt, 1937)
 Yimnashana hamulata lautauana (Gressitt, 1937)

References

Gyaritini
Beetles described in 1937